Pichi Pullayya is a 1953 Indian Telugu-language drama film directed by T. Prakash Rao. It stars N. T. Rama Rao, Sowcar Janaki and Krishna Kumari, with music composed by T. V. Raju. The film was produced by N. Trivikrama Rao on National Art Theatres banner.

Plot 
In a village lives an innocent guy Pullayya who does not know anything about the world, his father Seshayya sends him to the city to work at Zamindarini Manorama Devi's house. The maid Kantham takes a liking to him.

A distant relative of the deceased Zamindar, Bhupala Rao controls the estate by enticing Manorama Devi. She is fond of her stepson Chinababu and his wife Vasantha. Bhupala Rao is after the wealth supposedly hidden under the Zamindar's Samadhi. Vasantha thwarts his dubious plans.

To get rid of her, Bhupala Rao spreads a rumour that she has an illicit relationship with Pullayya. The pregnant Vasantha is thrown out of the house. Pullayya takes her to his village and there she gives birth to a baby boy. Bhupala Rao hires men to demolish the Samadhi and in the process, assaults Manorama Devi and blames Pullayya. Manorama Devi testifies against Bhupala Rao in court, Pullayya is released and Bhupala Rao and his cronies are punished. Finally, the movie ends on a happy note with the marriage of Pullayya and Kantham.

Cast 
N. T. Rama Rao as Pullayya
Sowcar Janaki as Vasantha
Krishna Kumari as Kantham
Gummadi as Bhupala Rao
Ramana Reddy as Neelakantam
Amarnath as Chinna Babu
Mahankali Venkaiah as Kodandaramayya
Koduru Achaiah as Seshayya
Chaya Devi as Manorama Devi
Hemalatha
Mohana as Nurse

Music 

Music was composed by T. V. Raju. Lyrics were written by Anisetti Subba Rao.

References

External links 
 

1953 drama films
Films directed by T. Prakash Rao
Films scored by T. V. Raju
Indian black-and-white films
Indian drama films